Chehel Amiran may refer to:
 Chehel Amiran, Bijar
 Chehel Amiran, Chang Almas, Bijar County